Francis Augustus Cook (1843–1916) was a career United States Navy officer who served from 1860 until 1903. He was one of the few United States Navy officers to serve in combat in both the American Civil War and the Spanish–American War.

Early life
He was born in Northampton, Massachusetts on May 10, 1843. He was the son of Benjamin E. Cook and Elizabeth Christine (Griffin) Cook. His father was a general in the Massachusetts Militia.

Naval career
He was appointed as a midshipman at the United States Naval Academy in 1860. He graduated and was promoted to acting Ensign on October 1, 1863. He served on board the USS Seminole at the Battle of Mobile Bay on August 5, 1864.
 
He rose to the rank of captain in February 1896 and became the commanding officer of the cruiser  in December 1896. The Brooklyn was assigned as the flagship of the Flying Squadron under Rear Admiral Winfield Scott Schley with Cook serving as Schley's flag captain and de facto chief of staff.

The Brooklyn, under Cook's command, highly distinguished herself at the Battle of Santiago de Cuba on July 3, 1898. Captain Cook received the surrender of the Spanish ship Cristobal Colon after the battle.

He was promoted to rear admiral on March 21, 1903 and retired on September 5 of the same year.

He was a member of the Military Order of the Loyal Legion of the United States and the Military Order of Foreign Wars.

He died in Northampton, Massachusetts on October 8, 1916 at the age of 73. He is buried in the United States Naval Academy Cemetery in Annapolis, Maryland.

References

Sources
 Dictionary of Admirals of the U.S. Navy. William B. Cogar. Naval Institute Press. Annapolis, Maryland. 1991. Volume 2 (1901–1918). pg. 54.

United States Navy rear admirals
1843 births
1916 deaths
Burials at the United States Naval Academy Cemetery